Jessica Warner is an American historian, specializing in the social history of Great Britain in the early modern age. Her books include Craze: Gin and Debauchery in an Age of Reason and The Incendiary: The Misadventures of John the Painter, First Modern Terrorist. The latter book has won praise from fellow historians like Simon Schama and Brenda Maddox.

Warner was born and raised in Washington, DC. She is a graduate of Princeton University and Yale University. She currently teaches at the University of Toronto.

References

External links
Official site

21st-century American historians
Living people
Year of birth missing (living people)
Yale University alumni
Princeton University alumni
Academic staff of the University of Toronto
American women historians
21st-century American women writers